David Shapiro (born January 2, 1947) is an American poet, literary critic, and art historian. He has written some twenty volumes of poetry, literary, and art criticism. He was first published at the age of thirteen, and his first book was published when he was eighteen.

Education and teaching

Born in Newark, New Jersey, Shapiro grew up in Newark and attended Weequahic High School before matriculating at Columbia University at the age of 16 (with the assistance of Kenneth Koch), from which he holds a B.A. (1968) and a Ph.D. (1973) in English. Already a musician of professional competence as a youth, from 1963 he was a violinist with the New Jersey Symphony and the American Symphony, among others. Between 1968-1970, he studied at the University of Cambridge on a Kellett Fellowship, from which he holds an M.A. with honors. Having previously taught at Columbia (in the Department of English and Comparative Literature), Princeton University, and Brooklyn College, Shapiro teaches poetry and literature at Cooper Union and is currently the William Paterson professor of art history at William Paterson University.

He achieved brief notoriety during the 1968 student uprising at Columbia, when he was photographed sitting behind the desk of President Grayson L. Kirk wearing dark glasses and smoking a cigar; Shapiro later described the cigar as "horrible".

Works
Shapiro's writing includes a monograph on John Ashbery, a book on Jim Dine’s paintings, a book on Piet Mondrian’s flower studies, and a book on Jasper Johns’ drawings. He has translated Rafael Alberti’s poems on Pablo Picasso, and the writings of the Sonia and Robert Delaunay.

His sonnets on the death of Socrates are the basis for Unwritten, a song cycle by Mohammed Fairouz.

List of works
 January: A Book of Poems–Holt, Rinehart and Winston, 1965
 Poems From Deal–E P Dutton, 1969
 An Anthology of New York Poets (co-editor)–Random House, 1970
 A Man Holding an Acoustic Panel–E P Dutton, 1971 (National Book Award Nominee)
 The Page Turner–Liveright, 1973
 Lateness: A Book of Poems–Overlook/Viking, 1977
 Introduction to John Ashbery’s Poetry–Columbia University Press, 1979
 The Writings of Sonia and Robert Delaunay (co-translator)–Viking, 1979
 Jim Dine–Abrams, 1981; Alecta Press (German edition and translation)
 Lateness (Watercolors by Lucio Pozzi)–Generations Press, Paris, 1981
 To An Idea–Overlook/Viking, 1984
 Jasper Johns – Abrams, 1984
 The Body's Words on JM Haessle, 1988
 House (Blown Apart): A Book of Poems–Overlook/Viking, 1988
 Mondrian: Flowers–Abrams, 1991
 The Selected Poems of Jacques Dupin (co-translator)–Wake Forest, 1992
 The Eight Names of Picasso (co-translator)–Gas Station Editions, 1992
 After A Lost Original (etching by Terry Winters)–Solo Press, 1992
 The Green Lake is Awake: The Selected Poems of Joseph Ceravolo (co-editor)–Coffee House Press, 1994
 After A Lost Original–Overlook Press, 1994
 Inventory: New & Selected Poems (editor) by Frank Lima-Hard Press, 1997
 Body of Prayer (Shapiro, Michal Govrin, Derrida)–Cooper Union Press, 2001
 A Burning Interior–Overlook Press, 2002
 Rabbit Duck (Collaborative with Richard Hell) – Repair, 2005
 New and Selected Poems (1965–2006)– Overlook Press, 2007
 In Memory of an Angel -City Lights Publishers, 2017. 
 Человек без книги (A Man Without a Book; Selected poems translated into Russian by Gali-Dana Zinger) - Literature without borders (Latvia), 2017.

Personal life
Shapiro lives in Riverdale, The Bronx, New York City, with his wife and son.

References

Sources
 The Poetry of David Shapiro

Further reading
 Thomas Fink, The Poetry of David Shapiro, Farleigh Dickinson University Press, Madison & Teaneck, NJ, 1993; 
 Thomas Fink & Joseph Lease, Burning Interiors: David Shapiro’s Poetry and Poetics, Farleigh Dickinson University Press, Madison & Teaneck, NJ, 2007; . Includes essays by Paul Hoover, Joanna Fuhrman, Stephen Paul Miller, Denise Duhamel, Noah Eli Gordon, Ron Silliman, Tim Peterson, Timothy Liu, more.
 New York Quarterly, Issue 65, has an extensive interview with David Shapiro.

External links

 
 In the Presence of Genius: Rodger Kamenetz on New and Selected Poems review which appeared in the Jewish Daily Forward, July 18, 2007
Annotated Torso of an Interview David Shapiro in conversation with Sam Lohmann, March 2009
Jacket magazine features
Jacket Magazine, issue 23 this issue includes a David Shapiro Feature, with numerous links to essays, reviews, poems (6 poems from A Burning Interior), and an interview of Shapiro conducted by John Tranter
The Terror of the Poet David Shapiro in conversation with Kent Johnson, an interview by email conducted in 2009
A Conversation with Kenneth Koch Shapiro’s 1969 interview with the late Kenneth Koch.

1947 births
Living people
American male poets
Bard College faculty
Brooklyn College faculty
Columbia College (New York) alumni
Columbia University faculty
Weequahic High School alumni
Writers from Newark, New Jersey
Writers from the Bronx
Princeton University faculty
People from Riverdale, Bronx
Cooper Union faculty
William Paterson University faculty